Ravinder Singh Sangwan (born 3 September 1982, in Kharman, Haryana, India) is a Greco-Roman wrestler.

Singh has won 15 national championships and gold medals in the 2005, 2007, 2009 and 2011 Commonwealth Wrestling Championships. At the 2010 Commonwealth Games, he won a gold in the Men's Greco-Roman 60 kg wrestling category. At the 2010 Asian Games he won a bronze medal in the same category. Singh also competed in the 2013 World Wrestling Championships in Budapest, Hungary where he reached the quarter finals.

Ravinder Singh is employed as a deputy superintendent within the Haryana police force. He received an Arjuna Award in 2011.

References

Indian male sport wrestlers
Living people
1982 births
Sport wrestlers from Haryana
Commonwealth Games gold medallists for India
Wrestlers at the 2010 Commonwealth Games
People from Jhajjar
Recipients of the Arjuna Award
Asian Games medalists in wrestling
Wrestlers at the 2002 Asian Games
Wrestlers at the 2010 Asian Games
Wrestlers at the 2014 Asian Games
Commonwealth Games medallists in wrestling
Medalists at the 2010 Asian Games
Asian Games bronze medalists for India
Medallists at the 2010 Commonwealth Games